Dom Jorge da Costa (1406 – 18 September 1508) was a Portuguese cardinal.

Biography
Born in Alpedrinha, Fundão, he is often called the Cardinal of Alpedrinha. He was one of many children of Martim Vaz and wife Catarina Gonçalves. He made benefits to all his brothers and sisters.

He held a very large number of ecclesiastical offices. He was Archbishop of Lisbon 1464–1500 and 108th Archbishop of Braga 1486–1501.

He was the confessor of Afonso V of Portugal. From 1478 he was in exile in Rome, having clashed with John II of Portugal, at that point in power though not yet reigning. He died a centenarian in Rome. He is buried in the church of Santa Maria del Popolo in the Costa Chapel that he purchased in 1488 and furnished with high quality works of art.

He died on 18 September 1508 aged between 101 and 102, making him the second longest lived cardinal after Cardinal Bafile who died on 3 February 2005 at the age of 101 years, 214 days.

Notes

1406 births
1508 deaths
16th-century Portuguese cardinals
Cardinal-bishops of Albano
Cardinal-bishops of Frascati
Cardinal-bishops of Porto
Portuguese centenarians
Roman Catholic archbishops of Braga
15th-century Portuguese cardinals
People from Fundão, Portugal
Men centenarians